= Adult alternative =

Adult alternative may refer to:

- Adult album alternative, a radio format
- Modern adult contemporary, a radio format
- Smooth jazz, a radio format
